Joshua Thomas Sargent (born February 20, 2000) is an American professional soccer player who plays as a forward or winger for EFL Championship club Norwich City and the United States national team. In May 2017, at the age of 17, he became the youngest U.S. player to score at the FIFA U-20 World Cup.

Early life
Sargent was born in O'Fallon, Missouri, to Jeff and Liane Sargent, both of whom played college-level soccer. Sargent joined the Scott Gallagher Soccer Club at eight years old. He attended St. Dominic for part of his high school years before moving to Florida to join the U.S. residency program. He was ranked as the No. 2 high school soccer player in the country.

Club career

Early career
Sargent played for Scott Gallagher Missouri, a U.S. Soccer Development Academy club from St. Louis, Missouri. After his impressive performance at the 2016 Nike International Friendlies, he spent two weeks training with Sporting Kansas City in the summer of 2016 and the MLS club acquired the player's acquisition rights, as St. Louis is in Sporting Kansas City's homegrown player territory. In October of the same year, Sargent spent a week-long training spell with Dutch club PSV Eindhoven. In January 2017, after being called for the United States U20 team, he trained with German club FC Schalke 04.

Werder Bremen
On September 20, 2017, Werder Bremen announced that Sargent would join the club on January 1, 2018, and then sign a professional contract on his 18th birthday, per FIFA rules. He played with the club's under-23 squad in a friendly match and signed his contract on February 20, 2018, making him eligible to join the first team for the 2018–19 season.

On December 7, 2018, Sargent made his debut for the Werder Bremen first team, coming on as a substitute in the 76th minute in a match against Fortuna Düsseldorf. He scored with his first touch of the match in the 78th minute, the fastest goal by a debutant in club history.

In February 2019, Sargent agreed to a "long-term" contract extension with the club.

Norwich City

2021–22 season
On August 9, 2021, Sargent left Werder Bremen to join Premier League club Norwich City on a four-year deal for an undisclosed fee, reported as in the region of €9.5 million. Five days later, he made his debut in a 3–0 home defeat against Liverpool after coming on as a substitute at 77th minute in place of his former Werder Bremen teammate Milot Rashica. He scored his first two goals for the club on August 24, in an emphatic 6–0 victory over Bournemouth in the second round of the EFL Cup.
On January 21, 2022, Sargent scored his first league goals of the season, one of them a scorpion-kick, in a 3–0 win over fellow Premier League relegation battlers Watford.

2022–23 season
Sargent remained at Norwich following their relegation. Sargent scored his first goal of the season in Norwich's first league win of the season against Huddersfield Town. Three days later, he notched a brace in a 2–0 win against Millwall. Sargent continued his goal-scoring form, netting the winner for Norwich away to Sunderland, before netting in back-to-back games for the second time of the season in victories against Coventry City and Bristol City respectively. He scored in back-to-back games again, this time in defeats at home against Preston North End, and away to Watford. He scored again in a 2–1 home defeat against Middlesbrough, in Norwich's final match before the 2022 FIFA World Cup.

After returning from representing the United States at the World Cup, Sargent's goal scoring form slowed, however he still netted in Norwich's 4–2 away win against Coventry, and again two weeks later in a 3–1 home win over Hull City. However Sargent suffered an ankle injury in a goal-less draw away to Wigan Athletic, and would miss the next three games.

International career

Youth
Sargent first appeared in a United States under-14 camp in 2013. In the same year, he was called for the United States under-15.

In 2015, he joined the Under-17 MNT Residency Program in Bradenton, Florida. He was a key part of the team that won the 2016 Nike International Friendlies, scoring four goals and notching two assists in three matches. On April 17, 2017, Sargent was included by coach John Hackworth in the 20-man squad chosen to represent United States at the 2017 CONCACAF U-17 Championship. He scored five goals in the tournament, including two goals in a victory over Mexico. He led the United States as they reached the final and qualified for the 2017 FIFA U-17 World Cup.

Only two days later, Sargent was surprisingly included by coach Tab Ramos in the 21-man squad called to represent United States at the 2017 FIFA U-20 World Cup. On May 22, the Americans debuted in the tournament against Ecuador. Sargent started the match and scored two goals, helping his team to tie the match and becoming the youngest American player to ever score in an under-20 World Cup. Sargent is the second American player, after Freddy Adu, to play in both the under-17 and under-20 World Cups in the same year.
On June 1, 2017, after scoring against New Zealand, Sargent joined Jozy Altidore, Eddie Johnson and Taylor Twellman, becoming one of the United States's all-time leading goalscorers at the under-20 World Cup.

Senior
On November 7, 2017, Sargent received his first senior call up for a friendly against Portugal. He thus became the only American player ever to appear in an under-17, under-20, and senior camp in the same calendar year. On May 28, 2018, Sargent earned his first cap for the senior team in a friendly against Bolivia and scored his first international goal. He became the fourth-youngest player to score for the United States, until Timothy Weah, two days younger than Sargent, scored his first goal minutes later.

On 9 November 2022, Sargent was named in the United States 26-man squad for the 2022 FIFA World Cup. Sargent would play in all 3 of the United States' group matches, starting the games against Wales and Iran. Sargent hit the post with a header early in the match against Wales. He was substituted after picking up an ankle injury against Iran. This ruled Sargent out of the United States' round of 16 clash against the Netherlands.

Personal life 
Josh Sargent is married to Kirsten Lepping. They were engaged in August 2020. Sargent has one daughter who was born on January 13, 2022.

Career statistics

Club

International

Scores and results list United States' goal tally first, score column indicates score after each Sargent goal.

Honors
United States U17 
CONCACAF Under-17 Championship runner-up: 2017

United States
CONCACAF Nations League: 2019–20

Individual
FIFA U-20 World Cup Silver Boot: 2017

References

External links

 
 
 
 Josh Sargent PDL stats

2000 births
Living people
People from O'Fallon, Missouri
Sportspeople from Greater St. Louis
Soccer players from Missouri
American soccer players
United States men's international soccer players
United States men's youth international soccer players
United States men's under-20 international soccer players
United States men's under-23 international soccer players
Association football forwards
SV Werder Bremen players
SV Werder Bremen II players
Norwich City F.C. players
Bundesliga players
2. Bundesliga players
Regionalliga players
Premier League players
2022 FIFA World Cup players
American expatriate soccer players
American expatriate soccer players in Germany
American expatriate sportspeople in England
Expatriate footballers in England
English Football League players